Elnur Abduraimov is an Uzbekistani professional boxer. He won bronze medal at 2015 AIBA World Boxing Championships as an amateur. 

He also won bronze medal at the 2015 Asian Championships. He went on to win gold at the 2017 Asian Championships.

Abduraimov competed at the 2020 Summer Olympics.

Professional career
On 29 Sep 2018, Abduraimov made his professional debut against American Aaron Jamel Hollis. Abduraimov won the bout after knocking Hollis out with a left hand to the body in the opening round.

Professional boxing record

References

External links 
 
 

Year of birth missing (living people)
Living people
Uzbekistani male boxers
Lightweight boxers
AIBA World Boxing Championships medalists
Asian Games competitors for Uzbekistan
Boxers at the 2014 Asian Games
Olympic boxers of Uzbekistan
Boxers at the 2020 Summer Olympics